Puu Kukui is a mountain peak in Hawaii. It is the highest peak of  Mauna Kahalawai (the West Maui Mountains). The  summit rises above the Puu Kukui Watershed Management Area, an  private nature preserve maintained by the Maui Land & Pineapple Company.  The peak was formed by a volcano whose caldera eroded into what is now the Iao Valley.

Rainwater unable to drain away flows into a bog. The soil is dense, deep, and acidic.

Puu Kukui is home to many endemic plants, insects, and birds, including the greensword (Argyroxiphium grayanum), a distinctive bog variety of ōhia lehua (Metrosideros polymorpha var. pseudorugosa) and many lobelioid species.   Due to the mountain peak's extreme climate and peat soil, many species, such as the ōhia, are represented as dwarfs.  Access to the area is restricted to researchers and conservationists.

See also
 
 
 
 
 
List of mountain peaks of the United States
 Big Bog, Maui
 Mount Waialeale
List of volcanoes of the United States
List of mountain peaks of Hawaii
List of Ultras of Oceania
List of Ultras of the United States
Hawaii hotspot
Evolution of Hawaiian volcanoes
Hawaiian–Emperor seamount chain

References

External links
 

Volcanoes of Maui Nui
Polygenetic shield volcanoes
Hotspot volcanoes
Wetlands of Hawaii
Landforms of Maui
Nature reserves in Hawaii
Protected areas of Maui